H. montana may refer to:

Hechtia montana, a plant of the family Bromeliaceae
Heliciopsis montana, tree of the family Proteaceae
Hopea montana, plant in the family Dipterocarpaceae
Horsfieldia montana, plant of the family Myristicaceae
Hovea montana, mountain hovea, shrub of the family Fabaceae
Hudsonia montana, the mountain golden heather, a flowering plant species endemic to North Carolina
Hybomitra montana, slender-horned horsefly
Hyperplatys montana, longhorn beetle of the subfamily Lamiinae